HMS Montagu was a  pre-dreadnought battleship of the British Royal Navy. The Duncan-class battleships were armed with a main battery of four  guns and they were broadly similar to the s, though of a slightly reduced displacement and thinner armour layout. Montagu was built between her keel laying in November 1899 and her completion in July 1903. The ship had a brief career, serving for two years in the Mediterranean Fleet before transferring to the Channel Fleet in early 1905. During wireless telegraphy experiments in May 1906, she ran aground off Lundy Island. Repeated attempts to refloat the ship failed, and she proved to be a total loss. She was ultimately broken up in situ.

Design

The Russian ships were fast second-class battleships, so William Henry White, the British Director of Naval Construction, designed the Duncan class to match the purported top speed of the Russian vessels. The Duncans proved to be disappointments in service, owing to their reduced defensive characteristics, though they were still markedly superior to the Peresvets they had been built to counter.

The Duncan-class battleships displaced  normally and up to  fully loaded. Her crew numbered 720 officers and ratings. The Duncan-class ships were powered by a pair of 4-cylinder triple-expansion engines that drove two screws, with steam provided by twenty-four Belleville boilers. The boilers were trunked into two funnels located amidships. This made Montagu and her sisters the fastest battleships in the world for several years.

Montagu had a main battery of four  40-calibre guns mounted in twin-gun turrets fore and aft. The ships also mounted a secondary battery of twelve  45-calibre guns mounted in casemates, in addition to ten 12-pounder  guns and six 3-pounder  guns for defence against torpedo boats. As was customary for battleships of the period, she was also equipped with four  torpedo tubes submerged in the hull.

Her conning tower had 12-inch-thick sides.

Service history
The keel for HMS Montagu was laid down on 23 November 1899, and her completed hull was launched on 5 March 1901. She began sea trials in February 1903 and was commissioned into the fleet on 28 July at Devonport Dockyard for service in the Mediterranean Fleet. In February 1905, she transferred to the Channel Fleet.

Grounding and loss

In late May 1906, Montagu tested new wireless telegraphy equipment in the Bristol Channel, sending and receiving test messages with wireless stations ashore. Late on 29 May, she was anchored off Lundy Island, but could not pick up the messages from the test station, so the ship weighed anchor to steam to the Isles of Scilly. Heavy fog forced her to reverse course and steam back to Lundy Island after four hours, but her navigator miscalculated the course, placing her some two miles off her original track. Montagu encountered a pilot cutter cruising in the vicinity of Lundy Island, slowed to a stop, and came alongside the cutter to request a distance and bearing for Hartland Point on the mainland. Though the cutter supplied these accurately, the voice from the battleships bridge replied that they must be wrong and that the pilot cutter must have lost her bearings. As Montagu restarted her engines and began to move ahead, the cutter shouted back that on her present course Montagu would be on Shutter Rock within ten minutes, and a short time later the sound of the battleship running aground carried through the fog.

At 02:00 on 30 May, Montagu ran aground on Shutter Rock, suffering a  gash on her starboard side. Unable to free herself from the rocks, she slowly filled with water; twenty-four hours later, her starboard engine room and all of her boiler rooms were flooded, among others. Her crew counter-flooded the port engine room to prevent her from listing further to starboard. Divers inspected the hull to determine the extent of the damage, which proved to be more serious than initially expected. The bottom of the ship also received extensive damage, including several other holes and the port propeller shaft having been torn from the hull. The starboard bilge keel was also ripped from the hull, as was the rudder. The wreck rested on a fairly even bottom, so there was hope that the ship could be refloated.

Since the Royal Navy had no dedicated salvage unit, it turned to Frederick Young, a former Royal Navy captain who now worked as the chief salvage officer of the Liverpool Salvage Association. Young was at that time the foremost expert on marine salvage in Britain, so he was hired to advise Admiral Sir Arthur Wilson, the commander of the Channel Fleet, who had no experience in salvage operations. The navy initially hoped to lighten the ship by removing the medium and small-caliber guns and other equipment that could be easily taken off and then to pump out the water so that the holes in the hull could be patched. Difficulties with pumping, owing in part to the subdivision of the internal compartments and the need to reflood the ship during high tide to keep her from suffering more damage before the hull could be patched, led the salvors to give up the operation.

Wilson next sought to remove armour plate from the sides of the ship and to erect a series of caissons, at which point a powerful air pump would be used to blow the water out of the hull. The caissons repeatedly broke free even in mild seas, and the air pump failed to have the desired effect. Her sister ship  herself ran aground whilst trying to help the salvage effort, though she was successfully freed. At the end of the summer of 1906, salvage efforts were suspended for the year, with plans to resume them in 1907. However, an inspection of the ship conducted from 1 to 10 October 1906 found that the action of the sea was driving her further ashore and bending and warping her hull so that her seams were beginning to open, her deck planking was coming apart, and her boat davits had collapsed. Having failed to refloat Montagu, the navy decided to abandon the project. Further material was removed from the wreck, including her main battery guns, which were later re-used in other vessels.

The Western Marine Salvage Company of Penzance completed salvage of the wreck for scrap metal over the next 15 years. The court martial convened for the affair blamed the thick fog and faulty navigation for the wreck. The trial was held aboard . The ship's captain, Thomas Adair, and the navigation officer, Lieutenant James Dathan, were severely reprimanded, with both men being dismissed from HMS Montagu; Dathan lost two years of seniority in rank as well. The wreck site, which now amounts to little more than some armour plate on the sea floor, is a popular diving location. Divers have also located parts of her gun turrets and shells that were not recovered during the salvage operation. In September 2019 the British Government granted the wreck site—including the steps which had been chiseled out of the cliff during the salvage effort—protected status.

Notes

References

Further reading
 
 
 
 

 

Duncan-class battleships
Ships built in Plymouth, Devon
1901 ships
Maritime incidents in 1906
Shipwrecks in the Bristol Channel
Wreck diving sites in the United Kingdom
Lundy